Ibon Navarro Pérez de Albéniz (born April 30, 1976, Vitoria-Gasteiz, Álava) is a Spanish basketball coach. He currently works for Unicaja of the Spanish Liga ACB.

Coaching career
Ibon Navarro has been a coach in the lower categories of Saski Baskonia from 2000 to 2005. His first experience in professional basketball was as assistant coach of Rafa Sanz at Tenerife Rural. One year later, Navarro debuted in Spanish League during the 2007–08 season as the assistant coach of Neven Spahija and stayed there until 2010. After leaving Vitoria-Gasteiz he was the assistant coach of Paco Olmos in his experiences at Menorca, where the team finished in the last position, Valencia Basket, where Olmos was sacked during the season, and the Puerto Rico national team, achieving the silver medal at the 2014 Centrobasket.

Ibon Navarro helped Baskonia win two Spanish Leagues, one Spanish King's Cup and two Spanish Supercups. With Valencia he was the runner-up in the Spanish King's Cup and in EuroCup.

In 2013, he came back to Laboral Kutxa as assistant of Sergio Scariolo. In November 2014, after the dismissal of Scariolo and Marco Crespi, Navarro assumed the role of head coach. In February 2015, the club published a documentary about him.

In June 2015, the club announced he would not continue as head coach of the first team, although his continued participation in the club was encouraged. He waved off the fans  thanking all the confidence and support received during his stay in the club.

In July 2015, Navarro signed a three-year deal with ICL Manresa. In June 2017, Navarro part ways with ICL Manresa after the relegation to LEB Oro and signed a one-year deal with UCAM Murcia. With Murcia, Navarro reached the Champions League Final Four in the club's first participation losing to AEK Athens in the semifinals and winning the third place game over MHP Riesen Ludwigsburg.

In June 2018, Navarro ended contract with UCAM Murcia and signed a two-year deal with MoraBanc Andorra.

On February 10, 2022, he has signed with Unicaja of the Liga ACB.

Trophies
 2007–08 TAU Cerámica. Spanish League champion.
 2007–08 TAU Cerámica. Spanish King's Cup runner-up.
 2007–08 TAU Cerámica. Spanish Supercup champion.
 2008–09 TAU Cerámica. Spanish League runner-up.
 2008–09 TAU Cerámica. Spanish King's Cup champion.
 2008–09 TAU Cerámica. Spanish Supercup champion.
 2009–10 Caja Laboral. Spanish League champion.
 2011–12 Valencia Basket. EuroCup runner-up.
 2012–13 Valencia Basket. Spanish King's Cup runner-up.
 2014 Puerto Rico. Centrobasket silver medal. .

Others
 2014 Puerto Rico  Centrobasket.
 Graduated in chemical sciences.

References

External links
 Ibon Navarro at acb.com 
 Ibon Navarro at euroleague.net
 
 

1976 births
Living people
Baloncesto Málaga coaches
BC Andorra coaches
Liga ACB head coaches
Saski Baskonia coaches
Spanish basketball coaches
Sportspeople from Vitoria-Gasteiz